The St. Martin Parish School Board (SMPSB) is an entity responsible for the operation of public schools in St. Martin Parish, Louisiana, United States. It is headquartered in the city of St. Martinville.

Current Superintendent of Schools
Allen "AL" Blanchard Jr. was appointed on Wednesday, March 13, 2019, as the superintendent of the Saint Martin Parish School Board.

Schools
St. Martin Parish consists of two non-contiguous areas. 16 schools are in "Upper St. Martin Parish" and one school, Stephensville Elementary School, is in "Lower St. Martin Parish."  Students in Lower St. Martin Parish attend Morgan City High School in nearby St. Mary Parish upon finishing at Stephensville Elementary School.

High schools
Grades 9-12
Breaux Bridge High School  (Breaux Bridge)
Cecilia High School  (Unincorporated area cecilia)
St. Martinville Senior High School (St. Martinville)
Notable alumni:
Charles Fuselier, sheriff of St. Martin Parish from 1980 to 2003; National Sheriff of the Year in 1996

Middle/Junior High Schools
Grades 7-8
Breaux Bridge Junior High School (Breaux Bridge)
Cecilia Junior High School (Unincorporated area cecilia )
Grades 5-8
Parks Middle School (Parks)
St. Martinville Junior High School (St. Martinville)

Elementary schools
Grades 4-6
Breaux Bridge Elementary School (Breaux Bridge)
Teche Elementary School (Unincorporated area cecilia)
Grades 1-4
St. Martinville Primary School (St. Martinville)
Grades PK-4
Parks Primary School (Parks)
Grades PK-3
Breaux Bridge Primary School (Breaux Bridge)
Cecilia Primary School (Unincorporated area cecilia )
Grades PK-K
Early Learning Center (St. Martinville)

PK-8 Schools
Catahoula Elementary School (Unincorporated area)
Stephensville Elementary School (Unincorporated area)

Other Campuses
JCEP (St. Martinville)
St. Martin Parish Juvenile Center (St. Martinville)

Current School Principals
Shalita Manual (Breaux Bridge Elementary School)
Louis Blanchard (Breaux Bridge High School)
Denise Frederick (Breaux Bridge Junior High School)
Jill Bozeman (Breaux Bridge Primary School)
Nicole Usie (Cecilia High School)
Charee Theriot (Cecilia Junior High School)
Tiffany Francis (Cecilia Primary School)
Elizabeth Thibeaux-Clay (College and Career Center)
Jessica Landry (Early Learning Center)
Dr. Wanda Phillips (Parks Middle School)
Julie Laviolette (Parks Primary School)
Dequindra Ligon (St.Martin Junior High School)
Lisa Sylvester (St.Martinville Primary School)
Jonathan Lane (St.Martinville Senior High School)
Christopher Shirley (Stephensville Elementary School)
Shelly Dupre (Teche Elementary School)

References

External links

2. *St. Martin Parish School Board – Official site.

School districts in Louisiana
Education in St. Martin Parish, Louisiana